is a Dutch-Japanese anime film by Telecable Benelux B.V. The film is based on the novel of the same name by Finnish illustrator and writer Tove Jansson, originally published in Swedish. It was the first full-length Moomin film, and serves as a prequel to the 1990 anime series Moomin, introducing characters that would later appear in the series. It was released in Japan first theatrically on August 8, 1992 as a triple-feature with two unrelated shorter films, and was later released on home video with 10 minutes of extra footage.

The original Japanese release of the film was scored by Sumio Shiratori, re-using compositions that were created for the anime series. In addition, he composed two new opening and ending songs for the film—"Shiawase no morugaane" and "Kono uchuu he, tsutae tai", respectively, both sung by Emiko Shiratori. The international version of the film featured a new musical score composed by Pierre Kartner.

The film was later released in Europe, and has been dubbed to several European languages. It was the seventh most watched film in Finland during the 1992/1993 season with 166,738 viewers.

In 2020, the film was planned to be re-released theatrically to coincide with the 75th anniversary of the Moomin franchise. This version of the film is remastered in 4K, and includes a reworked soundtrack and newly recorded voice acting. The film's re-release was halted indefinitely as a result of the COVID-19 pandemic, with it yet to be officially released. The film's streaming and television rights have been acquired by C More and MTV.

Plot
Before the events of the film, Moomin's father had finished building Moominhouse. During one rainy evening, the Muskrat suddenly appears at the front door to stay because his riverbank home had been destroyed by Moominpappa's bridge, built earlier that day. The next day, the rain's turned everything black and according to Muskrat, it is soot from outer space. He believes that a threat is coming from space and nothing can be done. Moominpappa gets an idea about the astronomical observatory in the Lonely Mountains, where a telescope can see far into space. The next morning, on their way, the trio meets Snufkin for the first time, who has heard about a comet that could crash to Earth at any time. He joins the group, and they climb the steep mountains towards the observatory. On the way, Moomin finds a golden anklet, which Snufkin knows belongs to the Snorkmaiden.

They arrive at the observatory, where they discover that the comet will be colliding in two days. On the way back home, Moomin saves the Snorkmaiden from a giant carnivorous plant, and they immediately fall in love with each other. Both Snorks join the group while they try to reach Moominvalley before the comet. Two days later, Moomin and friends meet the Hemulen and when a hurricane strikes them, they all fly to the Moominhouse with Snufkin's tent. Back home, they all decide to move to a cave Sniff had found for shelter. Sniff is lost during the move when he sees a kitten and begins to follow it with a piece of cake. When there are only minutes left to the expected moment of the comet impact, Moomin and Snufkin find Sniff, who is paralyzed with fear, and they carry him into the cave at the last minute. The comet almost crashes into Earth, but suddenly changes its course and turns away.

The next morning, the sea returns and the characters celebrate on the beach, where Moomin gives Snorkmaiden a pearl he had found.

Differences with the releases and from the novel
In Japan, the film was preceded by the short films Little Twins Whose Summer Flew and Flower Witch Marie Belle: The Phoenix's Key, while in the rest of the countries it was shown in, it was its own separate film, often seen as a series finale. In international releases, the majority of the score was replaced with a new one by Pierre Kartner, as the majority had been recycled from the series. Kartner also wrote and performed three new songs to replace the opening and ending themes from the Japanese version; the first one playing after the opening scenes, the sea exploration of Moomin and My and Sniff's discovery of the cave, the second one playing over Sniff's exploration of the crater, and the last playing over the end scene and much of the credits. In many of these versions, loud sea waves are faded from the ending song, and in other versions, the song is either played in its entirety or, in the Polish version, plays the ending song of the series, after the movie's ending song ends.

As for from the novel, the differences are quite numerous:

 Little My does not appear in the book
 The first parts are heavily simplified; the beach trip is spontaneous in the movie, while in the novel, the characters end up there after attempting to go to a dangerous place and the seashell search they embark on for Moominmama. In the film, Sniff's discovery of the cave is a random find.
 Muskrat simply knocks on the door after his home gets destroyed in the film, while in the novel, Papa finds him while the others are sleeping.
 The slapstick scene before Muskrat drinks with the characters is removed.
 Muskrat is no longer a book reader, and his philosophies are his own ideas.
 The foreshadowing of the Hattifatteners is distilled to a simple sighting of them sailing down the river, in the montage of them traversing to the Lonely Mountains.
 My, Moomin and Sniff go the trip mainly through walking and subsequently, the only boat use is to the mountains to the observatory itself.
 Only the second Hemulen is in the movie.
 Moominpapa and Moominmama simply suggest the observatory to Moomin and his company, rather than plan to travel there themselves.
 The preparation for the first trip is not seen and both that and the trip take place on the same day, while the trip itself, for obvious reasons, happens later in the day.

Cast

An English dub of the film was released on the German DVD titled Die Mumins – Der Komet im Muminland. The English dub was produced by Hoek & Sonépouse/Eskimo and distributed by Telescreen Distribution, rather than Eco Studios and Maverick Entertainment respectively like with the English dub for the series. As a result, none of the English actors from the series reprise their roles.

Release
The film premiered in Japan on August 8, 1992, and in Finland on April 2, 1993. In 1993, Comet in Moominland was the seventh most watched film in Finland with 166,738 viewers. In total, the film attracted 176,413 viewers in Finland.

The film has been released on VHS and DVD. In addition to the Finnish version, the original Finnish DVD contains a Swedish version, as well as a Finnish version with Sámi subtitles. In 2012, VL-Media released new editions of the film, which included a Swedish version in addition to the Finnish version, as well as a Finnish version with Sámi subtitles. The film was included in the Blu-Ray box set for the Moomin anime series, which was released in Japan in 2012.

In 2018, the film was re-released on DVD, which was remastered digitally. At the time, the film had not been re-recorded in Finnish by the current voice actors who voiced the characters in the Moominvalley television series, so the new DVD release also included the original version of the film. However, unlike previous DVD releases, the new release does not include other language options or subtitles.

The 4K remastered version of the film was originally slated for release in September 2020. The re-release was then rescheduled to April 2022, before being halted indefinitely as a result of the COVID-19 pandemic.

References

External links

 Moomin MXTV Japan  

1992 anime films
1990s children's fantasy films
Films based on fantasy novels
Moomins
Animated films based on children's books
Films based on Finnish novels
Japanese animated feature films
Films about trolls
Japanese animated films
Comets in film
Films about impact events